Whippomorpha or Cetancodonta is a group of animals that contains all living cetaceans (whales, dolphins, etc.) and hippopotamuses, as well as their extinct relatives, i.e. Entelodonts and Andrewsarchus. All Whippomorphs  are descendants of the last common ancestor of Hippopotamus amphibius and Tursiops truncatus. This makes it a crown group. Whippomorpha is a suborder within the order Artiodactyla (even-toed ungulates). The placement of Whippomorpha within Artiodactyla is a matter of some contention, as hippopotamuses were previously considered to be more closely related to Suidae (pigs) and Tayassuidae (peccaries). Most contemporary scientific phylogenetic and morphological research studies link hippopotamuses with cetaceans, and genetic evidence has overwhelmingly supported an evolutionary relationship between Hippopotamidae and Cetacea. Modern Whippomorphs all share a number of behavioural and physiological traits; such as a dense layer of subcutaneous fat and largely hairless bodies. They exhibit amphibious and aquatic behaviors and possess similar auditory structures.

Etymology 
The name Whippomorpha is a combination of English (wh[ale] + hippo[potamus]) and Greek (μορφή, morphē = form). Some attempts have made to rename the suborder Cetancodonta, due to the misleading utilization of the suffix -morpha for a crown group, as well as the risk of confusion with the clade Hippomorpha (which consists of equid perissodactyls); however Whippomorpha maintains precedence.

Ecology

Distribution 
Modern Whippomorphs are widely distributed. Cetaceans can be found in almost all of the world's marine habitats, and some species, like the blue whale and humpback whale, have migratory ranges that comprise nearly the entire ocean. These whales typically migrate on a seasonal basis, moving to warmer waters to give birth and raise young before travelling to cooler waters with more optimal feeding grounds. Other cetacean species have smaller ranges that are concentrated around either tropical or subtropical waters. Some cetaceans live exclusively within a single marine body, such as the narwhal, whose range is limited to the Arctic Ocean.

By comparison, modern hippopotamuses are confined entirely to the African continent. Despite once being widespread across Europe and North Africa, hippos are now considered vulnerable and are limited to the lakes, rivers and wetlands of southern Africa.

Behaviour 

Both whales and hippos must surface in order to breathe. This can pose problems for sleeping Whippomorphs. Cetaceans overcome this problem by exhibiting unihemispheric sleep, meaning they rest one side of their brain at a time, allowing them to swim and surface during rest periods. Hippopotamuses surface to breathe every three to five minutes. This process is partially subconscious, allowing hippopotamuses to surface and breathe whilst sleeping. Both whales and hippos exhibit symbiotic relationships with smaller fish, which they use as cleaning stations, allowing the smaller organisms to feed on parasites that enter the creature's mouth.

Hippos are herbivores; normally their diet consists entirely of short grasses that they graze on. Some hippos have been observed consuming animals such as zebra and even other hippo carcasses. A hippo normally spends up to five hours a day grazing. They normally feed only on land, though occasional consumption of aquatic vegetation has been observed. By contrast, cetaceans are all carnivores, feeding on fish and marine invertebrates, with some individual species feeding on larger mammals and birds (such as seals and penguins).

Reproduction 
All whippomorphs are placental mammals, meaning that embryos are fed by the placenta, which draws nutrients from the mother's body. They are k-selected organisms, producing a limited number of offspring, but with a high rate of survival.

Hippos reach sexual maturity at six years of age and have a gestation period of approximately eight months. Mating typically occurs in the water. Female hippopotamuses isolate themselves for two weeks prior to giving birth. The birthing process also takes place underwater, meaning calves must swim to the surface in order to breathe for the first time. Hippopotamus calves suckle on land.

Cetaceans generally reach sexual maturity around 10 years of age, and have a gestation period of around 12 months. Cetaceans give birth to well-developed calves, like hippopotamuses. When suckling, the mother splashes milk into the calves' mouth, as they have no lips.

Taxonomy and phylogeny 
Whippomorpha is a suborder located within the Order Artiodactyla, and the clade Cetancodontamorpha. It contains the clades Hippopotamoidea (ancestors of hippopotamuses) and Cetaceamorpha (ancestors of whales and dolphins). Whippomorpha is considered a sister clade to Ruminantia (which contains cattle, sheep and deer), as well as the extinct Raoellidae. Hippopotamoidea was formerly included to Suiformes with Suidae (pigs) and Tayassuidae (peccaries). 

Most of the evidence supporting the Whippomorpha clade is based on molecular or genetic analysis. Early support for the existence of a Cetacea/Hippopotamidae clade originated from analysis of the molecular composition of a blood-clotting protein γ-fibrinogen taken from whales and hippopotamuses. Later studies obtained findings that indicated almost 11,000 orthologous genes between cetaceans and hippopotamuses, in addition to numerous positive indicators of a shared evolutionary history between cetaceans and hippopotamuses. Furthermore, some genetic sequences have been found in both whales and hippopotamuses that are not present in the genomes of other mammals. This would indicate that these groups share ancestry.

Whippomorpha's placement within Artiodactyla can be represented in the following cladogram:

Evolution 

It is unknown whether the last common ancestor of whales and hippos led an aquatic, semiaquatic/amphibious, or terrestrial lifestyle. Therefore, it is a matter of contention whether the aquatic traits of both hippopotamuses and cetaceans are linked or the product of convergent evolution. Recent findings seem to indicate that the latter is more likely.

Whippomorpha diverged from other Cetartiodactyls approximately 59 Myr, whilst whales diverged from hippos approximately 55 Myr. The first branch contained ancestors of Cetacea; semi-aquatic protowhales such as Pakicetus in the group Archaeoceti, which developed into the exclusively aquatic ancestors of modern cetaceans.

One evolutionarily significant whale ancestor was the raoellid Indohyus, which was a Himalayas-dwelling, digitgrade omnivore roughly the size of a raccoon. It was not an adept swimmer, although it was thought to have spent considerable periods of time wading in shallow water. This would have been assisted by its heavy bones, providing stability. Indohyus was likely to have a diet at least partially based on aquatic foraging. Evidence for this includes the fact that the tooth enamel of Indohyus was considerably less worn than would be expected for an animal with an exclusively terrestrial diet. One of the most crucial facets of the discovery of Indohyus was the presence of a thickened auditory bulla, otherwise known as an involucrum. This discovery was significant as the involucrum was a morphology thought previously to be exclusive to cetaceans, a synapomorphy. This feature irrefutably linked cetaceans to raoellids.

It is thought that early whales such as Nalacetus and Pakicetus were restricted to freshwater environments, as modern hippopotamuses are. The later Ambulocetus, was likely to have lived a much more aquatic lifestyle, with shorter legs and paddle-like hands and feet. It also likely represented a transitional organism from freshwater to seawater, as the isotopic analysis of the bones and teeth of Ambulocetus indicate that it inhabited estuaries.

The second branch of Whippomorpha is thought to have developed into the Anthracotheriidae family, who were the putative ancestors of modern hippopotamuses. The sediments in which anthracotheriid fossils have been fossilized indicate that they were at least partially amphibious, whilst the jaw structure of fossils of select species, particularly Anthracotherium, seem to indicate that it was an ancestral form of modern hippopotamuses.

These findings somewhat explain the once confusing paleontological age gap that existed as a major piece of evidence against an evolutionary link between Hippopotamidae and Cetacea. Previously, the oldest known cetacean fossils were approximately 50 Myr, while the earliest known hippopotamus fossils were around 15 Myr. The sum of the fossil knowledge indicates that whales and hippopotamuses developed amphibious and aquatic traits independently from one another, but that the features developed by their shared ancestors created pathways to the development of said adaptations. Thus the large difference in time between the discovery of cetacean and hippopotamid fossils is explained by the fact that hippos simply developed their semi-aquatic adaptations at a much later time than their cetacean cousins.

Anatomy 

All members of the suborder Whippomorpha share some anatomical similarities. Hippopotamus stomachs are multi-chambered as with all ruminants, however they do not regurgitate food. Instead, the hippopotamus stomach contains two preliminary chambers, which acts similarly to a compost bin, allowing foodstuffs to ferment before entering the animal's main stomach. All whale species possess similar stomach structures. Additionally, both animals bear single-lobed lungs (similar to other aquatic mammals), which allow to be filled with air more rapidly. This is a critical adaptation for both amphibious and aquatic organisms, as it reduces the frequency of dangerous trips to the water surface, where such organisms are more vulnerable to predation.

Hippos’ bodies contain a layer of dense fat, reminiscent of a whales’ blubber, and situated between skin and muscle. Hippos and whales both possess thick bones, which aid in rapid descent into water, have minimal hair (to aid in hydrodynamics) and a lack of sweat glands. Webbing is also present between the toes of hippopotamuses; a more land-suitable version of a whale's flippers. Hippos possess unique hind-limb musculature that provides them with powerful propulsion capabilities, rather than fine-tuned control. These features are characteristic of other ungulates.

There is strong resemblance between the dentition of primitive cetaceans and primitive ungulates, which seemingly cements the position of Cetacea within Artiodactyla. In addition, both Cetaceans and Artiodactyls possess two distinct components in their ears, the involucrum and sigmoid process. Similar features are considered responsible for the ability of cetaceans to hear underwater. The skeletons of prehistoric whales also contain uniquely shaped ankle bones, including a double-pulley system found only in even-toed ungulates and crucially not present in odd-toed ungulates.

Both hippos and whales have an unusually large and strangely-shaped larynx, which enables the booming calls of whales underwater and the unique noises produced by hippos to communicate while submerged.

Relationship with humans 
Whippomorphs have always had complex cultural and social relationships with humans. Modern hippopotamuses have a reputation for extreme aggression. Hippos are incredibly territorial and protective of their young, and are the deadliest mammal in Africa, killing between two and three thousand people a year. Despite this, hippos remain popular zoo animals. Hippos were hunted by ancient humans for food and sport. In Ancient Egypt, hippos were recognized as dangerous inhabitants of the river Nile, and a red hippo was the symbol of the god Set. The biblical Behemoth is thought to be based on or inspired by the hippo.

Modern hippopotamuses face a number of threats from humans. Common hippopotamuses are classed as vulnerable, and are subject to habitat destruction as a result of agriculture, water management, climate change and development of housing and urban areas. Pygmy hippopotamuses are considered endangered, with less than three thousand individuals in the wild. The few surviving pygmy hippopotamuses occupy a much smaller habitat area in Liberia, Sierra Leone and the Ivory Coast. They face threats from mining and quarrying, hunting and logging.

Cetaceans have also had an extensive history with humans. The primary threats to modern cetaceans are direct danger (from whaling), and indirect damage to whale habitats (through pollution and overfishing). Commercial shipping, petroleum drilling and coastal development can disrupt cetacean habitats. Thousands of cetaceans are affected by bycatching every year. Some evidence also exists that human-generated sound may account for increases in the rate of cetacean strandings. 

Whales were inspirations for many mythical creatures, including the Leviathan, which was interestingly associated with the Behemoth. Dolphins are mentioned in historical literature far more frequently than whales. Stories of dolphins typically include them playing a role in helping shipwrecked sailors or guiding lost ships. In the 20th Century, perceptions of whales changed, and now tourism for the purposes of whale-watching has become very popular. Cetaceans are revered for their immense size, intelligent and playful dispositions, displays of speed in water, and contributions to scientific research.

Whales have been kept in captivity by humans for research and entertainment for centuries. Particularly popular are killer whales. Conservation and animal rights organizations have been vehemently opposed to the captivity of these cetaceans. It is common for captive killer whales to display aggression towards other whales and their trainers. Bottlenose dolphins are also popular, due to their friendly behavior. They also fare better in captivity than other cetaceans.

References

 
Cetancodontamorpha